Cosmos is a neighborhood in the West Zone of Rio de Janeiro, Brazil.

Neighbourhoods in Rio de Janeiro (city)